Tolumonas auensis is a Gram-negative, rod-shaped bacterium in the genus Tolumonas. It has been studied as a biological producer of toluene from phenylalanine and other phenyl precursors.

References

External links
Type strain of Tolumonas auensis at BacDive -  the Bacterial Diversity Metadatabase

Aeromonadales
Bacteria described in 1996